The Aitken University Centre is located on the campus of the University of New Brunswick in Fredericton, New Brunswick.

Constructed in 1976, it is the home of the UNB Varsity Reds hockey and hosted UNB basketball games until the construction of the Richard J. Currie Center (sic) in 2011.
The arena hosted the University Cup in 2003, 2004, 2011, and 2012. The Aitken Centre was also the venue for the 2006 CIS Women's basketball championships, and the 2007 and 2008 CIS Women's volleyball championships.

The arena's capacity is 3,278 for ice events and 4,258 for concerts.

Other uses

The Aitken Centre was home to the American Hockey League's Fredericton Express (1981-1988) and Fredericton Canadiens (1990-1999).

The arena was used as a set during the filming of the television miniseries Canada Russia '72.  It stood in for the Montreal Forum, Maple Leaf Gardens and Luzhniki Palace of Sports.

External links
 Aitken University Centre Official Site

University of New Brunswick
Sports venues in New Brunswick
Buildings and structures in Fredericton
Indoor arenas in New Brunswick
Indoor ice hockey venues in Canada
Basketball venues in Canada
Fredericton Canadiens
Music venues in New Brunswick
Sports venues completed in 1976
Sport in Fredericton
1976 establishments in New Brunswick